Letheobia somalica, also known as the highland beaked snake or Ethiopian blind snake, is a species of snake in the family Typhlopidae. It is endemic to Ethiopia.

Geographic range
It appears to be endemic to Ethiopia.

Description
Body pale olive; head yellowish. Scales arranged in 24 rows around the body.

Snout very prominent, obtusely pointed, with a sharp horizontal cutting edge, below which are located the nostrils. Head shields granulated. Rostral very large. Portion of rostral visible from above slightly longer than broad; portion visible from below as long as broad. Nasal completely divided, the nasal cleft proceeding from the second upper labial. Preocular nearly as large as the ocular, in contact with the second and third upper labials. Ocular in contact with the third and fourth upper labials. Eyes not distinguishable. Prefrontal and supraoculars transversely enlarged. Diameter of body 90 times in total length. Tail slightly broader than long, ending in a small spine.

References

Further reading
 Boulenger, G.A. 1895. An Account of the Reptiles and Batrachians collected by Dr. A. Donaldson Smith in Western Somali-land and the Galla Country. Proceedings of the Zoological Society of London, Volume 1895, pp. 530–540, Plates XXIX. & XXX. (Typhlops somalicus, p. 536, Plate XXX., Figure 1.)

Letheobia
Snakes of Africa
Reptiles of Ethiopia
Endemic fauna of Ethiopia
Reptiles described in 1895
Taxa named by George Albert Boulenger